Guilherme de Paula Lucrécio (born 9 November 1986) is a profesional footballer who plays as a forward for Malaysia Premier League side Melaka. Born in Brazil, he represents the Malaysia national team.

He played once for Malaysia XI against Tottenham Hotspur F.C. In December 2019, De Paula has agreed to join Perak FC for the 2020 season. On 3 June 2021, he won his first cap for Malaysia in a 2022 FIFA World Cup qualification match against the United Arab Emirates.

Career statistics

Club

International

International goals
''As of match played 8 June 2022. Malaysia score listed first, score column indicates score after each goal.

Honours

Club
Selangor FC
 Malaysia Cup: 2015
Kuala Lumpur FC
 Malaysia Premier League: 2017
Johor Darul Ta'zim 
 Malaysia Super League: 2021

Individual
 Malaysia Cup Golden Boot: 2016
 Malaysia Premier League Golden Boot: 2017
 FAM Football Awards Best Forward Award: 2017

References

External links

Guilherme de Paula at soccerstats247
Guilherme de Paula at etminanbrazil

1986 births
Living people
Malaysian footballers
Malaysia international footballers
Brazilian footballers
Brazilian emigrants to Malaysia
Association football forwards
FC Milsami Orhei players
Brazilian expatriate footballers
Expatriate footballers in Moldova
Expatriate footballers in Cyprus
Brazilian expatriate sportspeople in Malaysia
Brazilian expatriate sportspeople in Moldova
Brazilian expatriate sportspeople in Cyprus
Vitória F.C. players
Selangor FA players
Ethnikos Achna FC players
Footballers from São Paulo